Bags Meets Wes! is an album by Milt Jackson and Wes Montgomery, released in 1962 by Riverside. It was reissued in 1999 by the Original Jazz Classics label, with additional takes, and again in 2006.

Reception 

In his AllMusic review, Alex Henderson wrote: "Although Jackson and Montgomery prove what lyrical ballad players they could be on the standard 'Stairway to the Stars', ballads aren't a high priority on this album. Instead, the improvisers put more of their energy into the blues..."

Track listing
 "S.K.J." (Milt Jackson) – 5:17
 "Stablemates" (Benny Golson) – 5:45
 "Stairway to the Stars" (Malneck, Parish, Signorelli) – 3:38
 "Blue Roz" (Wes Montgomery) – 4:46
 "Sam Sack" (Jackson) – 6:06
 "Jingles" (Montgomery) – 6:56
 "Delilah" (Victor Young) -6:07
1999 reissue:
 "S.K.J." (Jackson) – 5:17
 "Stablemates" (Golson) – 5:45
 "Stairway to the Stars [Take 3]" (Malneck, Parish, Signorelli) – 3:38
 "Blue Roz" (Montgomery) – 4:46
 "Sam Sack" (Jackson) – 6:06
 "Jingles [Take 9]" (Montgomery) – 6:55
 "Delilah [Take 4]" (Victor Young) – 6:12
 "Stairway to the Stars [Take 2]" (Malneck, Parish, Signorelli) – 3:47
 "Jingles [Take 8]" (Montgomery) – 6:54
 "Delilah" [Take 2] (Young) – 6:18

Personnel 
Musicians
 Milt Jackson – vibraphone
 Wes Montgomery – guitar
 Wynton Kelly – piano
 Sam Jones – double bass
 Philly Joe Jones – drums

Production
 Tamaki Beck – mastering
 Ken Deardoff – cover design
 Ray Fowler – engineer
 Joe Goldberg – liner notes
 Orrin Keepnews – producer, liner notes

References 

Milt Jackson albums
Wes Montgomery albums
1961 albums
Riverside Records albums
Albums produced by Orrin Keepnews